The Cook County Clerk is the clerk of county government in Cook County, Illinois.

History
The office of Cook County Clerk was established as an elected office with a four-year term in August 1837. Prior to this, from 1831 to 1837, the Clerk was appointed by the three cook County Commissioners.

Officeholders, 1837–present

Recent election results

|-
| colspan=16 style="text-align:center;" |Cook County Clerk general elections
|-
!Year
!Winning candidate
!Party
!Vote (pct)
!Opponent
!Party
! Vote (pct)
!Opponent
!Party
! Vote (pct)
!Opponent
!Party
! Vote (pct)
|-
|1986
| | Stanley Kusper
| | Democratic
| | 929,949 (68.35%)
| | Diana Nelson
| | Republican
| | 430,568	(31.35%)
| 
| 
| 
| 
| 
| 
|-
|1990
| | David D. Orr
| | Democratic
| | 799,884 (63.48%)
| | Sam Panayotovich
| | Republican
| | 353,531	(28.06%)
|Text style="background:#D2B48C | Heldia R. Richardson
|Text style="background:#D2B48C | Harold Washington Party
|Text style="background:#D2B48C | 106,588 (8.46%)
| 
| 
| 
|-
|1994
| | David D. Orr
| | Democratic
| | 
| | Edward Howlett
| | Republican
| | 
|Text style="background:#D2B48C |  Herman W. Baker, Jr.
|Text style="background:#D2B48C | Harold Washington Party
|Text style="background:#D2B48C | 
| Curtis Jones
| Populist
| 
|-
|1998
| | David D. Orr
| | Democratic
| | 988,136 (77.30%)
| | Judie A. Jones
| | Republican
| | 290,256 (22.70%)
| 
| 
| 
| 
| 
| 
|-
|2002
| | David D. Orr
| | Democratic
| | 992,441 (76.11%)
| | Kathleen A. Thomas
| | Republican
| | 311,552 (23.89%)
| 
| 
| 
| 
| 
| 
|-
|2006
| | David D. Orr
| | Democratic
| | 1,034,263 (80.78%)
| | Nancy Carlson
| | Republican
| | 246,044 (19.22%)
| 
| 
| 
| 
| 
| 
|-
|2010
| | David D. Orr
| | Democratic
| | 1,047,462 (77.77%)
| | Angel Garcia
| | Republican
| | 299,449 (22.23%)
| 
| 
|
| 
| 
| 
|-
|2014
| | David D. Orr
| | Democratic
| | 1,061,515 (100%)
| 
| 
| 
| 
| 
| 
| 
| 
| 
|-
|2018
| | Karen Yarbrough
| | Democratic
| | 1,415,244 (99.07%)
| Others
| Write-ins
| 13,120 (0.93%)
| 
| 
| 
| 
| 
| 
|-
|2022
| |Karen Yarbrough
| | Democratic
| |1,003,854 (71.58%)
| | Tony Peraica
| | Republican
| |368,095 (26.26%)
| | Joseph Schreiner
| | Libertarian
| |30,514 (2.18%)
| 
| 
|
| 
| 
|

References